The Catholic Church in Malaysia, Singapore and Brunei (its two small Malay neighbors) is composed of a Latin (Roman Rite) hierarchy, joint in the transnational Episcopal Conference of Malaysia, Singapore and Brunei, consisting of
 three ecclesiastical provinces in Malaysia, each headed by a Metropolitan archdiocese, with two suffragan dioceses each.
 two exempt jurisdictions, one for each small neighbor : a non-Metropolitan archdiocese for Singapore and a pre-diocesan Apostolic Vicariate for Brunei.

There are no Eastern Catholic jurisdictions.

There is an Apostolic Nunciature to Malaysia as papal diplomatic representation (embassy-level) in the national capital Kuala Lumpur. In it the Apostolic Delegation (lower level) to Brunei is also vested. There is a separate Apostolic Nunciature to Singapore (in the capital of the same name), into which are vested the Non-Residential Pontifical Representation for Vietnam and Apostolic Nunciature to the Association of Southeast Asian Nations (ASEAN, which all abovementioned states belong to, with others in the region).

Current Latin jurisdictions

Exempt jurisdictions 
 Archdiocese of Singapore, covering all and only Singapore
 Apostolic Vicariate of Brunei Darussalam, covering all and only Brunei

Ecclesiastical Province of Kuala Lumpur 
covering Peninsular Malaysia
 Metropolitan Archdiocese of Kuala Lumpur
 Roman Catholic Diocese of Malacca-Johor 
 Roman Catholic Diocese of Penang

Ecclesiastical Province of Kuching 
covering Sarawak state, on Borneo
 Metropolitan Archdiocese of Kuching
 Roman Catholic Diocese of Miri
 Roman Catholic Diocese of Sibu

Ecclesiastical Province of Kota Kinabalu 
covering Sabah state, on Borneo
 Metropolitan Archdiocese of Kota Kinabalu
 Roman Catholic Diocese of Keningau
 Roman Catholic Diocese of Sandakan.

Former jurisdictions 
There are no titular sees. All defunct jurisdictions have current successor sees.

The Archdiocese of Malacca-Singapore was split into the Archdiocese of Singapore and the Diocese of Malacca-Johor in 1972, seven years after Singapore became independent.

See also 
 List of Catholic dioceses (structured view)
 Catholic Church in Malaysia
 Catholic Church in Brunei
 Catholic Church in Singapore

Sources and external links 
 GCatholic.org - data for all sections.
 Catholic-Hierarchy entry.

Malaysia

Catholic dioceses
Catholic dioceses
Catholic dioceses